Allegany (Cattaraugus County)
Cattaraugus (Erie County, Cattaraugus County, Chautauqua County)
Cayuga Nation of New York (Seneca County)
Oil Springs (Cattaraugus County, Allegany County)
Oneida Indian Nation (Madison County)
Onondaga (Onondaga County)
Poospatuck (Suffolk County)
St. Regis Mohawk (Franklin County)
Shinnecock (Suffolk County)
Tonawanda (Genesee County, Erie County, Niagara County)
Tuscarora (Niagara County)

Lists of populated places in New York (state)
New York (state)-related lists
Reservations in New York (state)